Skelmersdale  is a town in the West Lancashire district of Lancashire, England.  It contains 21 listed buildings that are recorded in the National Heritage List for England.  All the listed buildings are designated at Grade II, the lowest of the three grades, which is applied to "buildings of national importance and special interest".  Originally it was an agricultural community, and later was associated with coal mining.  Sine the 1960s most of the area has been occupied by a New Town.  Almost all the listed buildings are, or originated as, farmhouses or farm buildings.  The other listed buildings are a cottage, a church, and a war memorial.


Buildings

References

Citations

Sources

Lists of listed buildings in Lancashire
Buildings and structures in the Borough of West Lancashire
Skelmersdale